Björn Otto (born 16 October 1977) is a retired German pole vaulter.

On 30 January 2013 in Cottbus, Germany, with the mark of 5.90 m, he set the masters world record M35.

Biography
His personal best is a jump of 6.01 metres, achieved on 5 September 2012 in Aachen. He cleared 5.92 metres indoors in February 2012 in Potsdam, and equaled it also at the German national indoor championships in Karlsruhe later that month. Arguably his biggest success was a second place at the 2012 Summer Olympics in London. In the same year, he also won a silver medal at the 2012 IAAF World Indoor Championships in Istanbul, Turkey, in March 2012 and a silver medal at the 2012 European Athletics Championships in Helsinki, Finland in July 2012.

Achievements

See also
 Six metres club
 German records in athletics
 Germany all-time top lists – Pole vault
 List of world records in masters athletics

References

External links
 
 
 
 
 
 

1977 births
Living people
German male pole vaulters
Athletes (track and field) at the 2012 Summer Olympics
Olympic athletes of Germany
Olympic silver medalists for Germany
European Athletics Championships medalists
Medalists at the 2012 Summer Olympics
Place of birth missing (living people)
Olympic silver medalists in athletics (track and field)
Universiade medalists in athletics (track and field)
Universiade gold medalists for Germany
Universiade bronze medalists for Germany
Medalists at the 2003 Summer Universiade
Medalists at the 2005 Summer Universiade